Eric Pacey (born May 3, 1978 in Toronto, Ontario) was a professional lacrosse player for the Minnesota Swarm of the National Lacrosse League. He was acquired in a trade with the Toronto Rock prior to the 2005 season and served as the assistant captain of the Swarm for five seasons. He also played junior hockey for the London Knights of the Ontario Hockey League and at York University.

Statistics

NLL

References

1978 births
Living people
Canadian expatriate lacrosse people in the United States
Canadian lacrosse players
Lacrosse defenders
Lacrosse people from Ontario
Minnesota Swarm players
Sportspeople from Toronto